Rudolf of Mecklenburg-Stargard (died 1415) was a Roman Catholic bishop of Skara (Sweden) and Schwerin. He resided in Bützow.

Rudolf was the son of Duke John I, Duke of Mecklenburg-Stargard and his wife, Countess Agnes of Lindow-Ruppin.  He was Bishop of Skara from 1386 to 1390 and then Bishop of Schwerin until his death.

In 1392, Rudolf was involved in the General Peace in Mecklenburg.

In 1407, he was instrumental in the Priest burning at Stralsund, as it was his task to pass judgement on the perpetrators.  When the accused did not appear before his court, he pronounced an interdict over the mayor and the city council and the citizens of Stralsund.  The interdict was lifted in 1416, after Rudolf's death, and after a large sum of money had been paid. Rudolf's successor used the money to decorate Schwerin Cathedral. A red inscription in the Cathedral reads  ("The citizens of Stralsund had to build this, after they had burned the priests." or "This [cathedral nave] have the Stralsund citizens built, [in repentance] for having burned the papists.")

References

14th-century German Roman Catholic bishops
15th-century German Roman Catholic bishops
Roman Catholic Prince-Bishops of Schwerin
House of Mecklenburg
14th-century births
1415 deaths
14th-century Roman Catholic bishops in Sweden
Sons of monarchs